"Farewell of Slavianka" is a Russian patriotic march, written by the composer Vasily Agapkin in honour of Slavic women accompanying their husbands in the First Balkan War. The march was written and premiered in Tambov in the end of 1912. In the summer of 1915, it was released as a gramophone single in Kiev. Slavianka means "Slavic woman".

History
The melody gained popularity in Russia and adjoining countries during the First World War, when the Russian soldiers left their homes and were accompanied by the music of the march. It was performed also during parade of 7 November 1941 on the Red Square after which soldiers went straight to fight in the Battle of Moscow. This march was also used as an unofficial anthem of Admiral Kolchak's White Army.

Western sources alleged that the song was banned prior to its use in the award-winning 1957 film The Cranes Are Flying, because of its lyrics about supposedly banned subjects. However, there are multiple documentations of the song being performed prior to this, many conducted by Agapkin himself. The earliest recorded publication of Farewell to Slavianka in the Soviet era was in 1929, and its earliest known performance by communist troops was in 1918.  Most famously, it was one of four marching tunes performed during the iconic 1941 October Revolution Parade in Red Square. The song was originally published by Zimmerman Production Association around 1912. The march was published in an official collection of music for Red Army orchestras, and it was recorded in the early 1940s by a military orchestra under the conductor Ivan Petrov (1906–1975), but different lyrics were then used. Other lyrics are now usually sung by the Red Army choir.

Subsequently, several Russian and Polish composers have written lyrics for the music. During the Second World War in German-occupied Poland, an adapted "underground" version of the song, Rozszumiały się wierzby płaczące ("Weeping Willows Began to Hum"), became popular in the Polish resistance and was based on lyrics by Roman Ślęzak.

In the 1990s, the political party Yabloko lobbied unsuccessfully for the march to be adopted as the Russian national anthem.

"Farewell of Slavianka" was used in movies like The Cranes Are Flying and Charlie Wilson's War, which is about the Soviet–Afghan War, and in the Russian movies 72 Meters (72 метра) and Prisoner of the Mountains (Кавказский пленник, Kavkazskiy plennik). An instrumental version of the song was also featured in the 1990 Ukrainian film Raspad ("Decay") during the Pripyat evacuation scene.

A Hebrew version was written in 1945 by the singer/songwriter Haim Hefer for the Palmach. In his version of the song,  ("Between Borders"), Hefer coined the phrase  (We are here a defensive wall), which was used by Israel Defense Forces to call Operation Defensive Shield (literally "Operation Defensive Wall") in 2002.

Lyrics

1967 version
The Farewell of Slavianka first received official lyrics under the Soviet leadership that were appropriate for the time's political climate, but references to Russian culture, religion and patriotism were changed. The new version by A. Fedotov.

The first version under the Soviet Union (1941) did not mention the Battle of Berlin, unlike the later version (1967).

1984 version
Another version of the lyrics was written by Vladimir Lazarev in 1984 and has gained the popularity since the dissolution of the Soviet Union in 1991 because of the slower tempo and the added human fragility factor ("Farewell, fatherland, remember us, … … not all of us will come back. ...").

1997 version
A White Army version of the march, written by Andrei Mingalyov, was created after the dissolution of the Soviet Union.

Tambov Oblast anthem
The Farewell of Slavianka melody was used for the Tambov Oblast anthem, whose lyrics were written on 22 May 2002 by A. Mitrofanov.

My Comrade in Death Throes
The melody of the song is also used for the poem My Comrade in Death Throes. Here is a sample verse:
Ты не плачь, не стони, ты не маленький, 
Ты не ранен, ты просто убит. 
Дай на память сниму с тебя валенки, 
Нам еще наступать предстоит.
Do not cry, do not moan, you're not little.
You're not wounded, you're simply killed.
Let me take off your valenki for memory,
We are yet to delve into attack.
It was written in December 1944 by Ion Degen, a Second World War tank ace.

Vapaa Venäjä
Another version of the song is Vapaa Venäjä, which was composed by the Finnish Red Guards to serve as a marching song for them.

References

External links
A Chinese rendition with translated (Red Army Choir) lyrics performed by the Male Choir of the People's Armed Police
A version from 1990s

1912 compositions
Russian military marches
Russian patriotic songs
Soviet songs
Songs about parting
Songs of World War I
Songs of World War II
1912 songs
Russian anthems